Lokhandwala Complex, also known as Lokhandwala, is a large upmarket and affluent residential and commercial neighbourhood in Andheri West suburb in Mumbai, India. It is approximately 5 km from Andheri station.  The name Lokhandwala comes from the name of the developer with the construction firm being Lokhandwala Constructions Pvt. Ltd. It was the primary developer of the suburb of Versova, which was previously basically a marshland. It is the starting point of Line 6 of the city's metro system.

History 

When Siraj Lokhandwala, proprietor of Lokhandwala Constructions, spotted the vast marshland in the area of Versova in 1968 he decided to purchase the area for development. He was discouraged by every broker in Mumbai from buying the land, simply because they felt that no one would wish to live at a comparative distance from the old centre of Mumbai. Today, however,Lokhandwala Complex is one of the most eagerly aspired to and most desirable suburbs of Mumbai.

A veritable who's who of Bollywood stars live in Lokhandwala, which has become home to many movie stars over the last twenty years. The list includes some of the finest actors, film directors, film writers, producers and most of the people who are working in Indian Film and Television Industry. Many of the NRIs  Non-Resident Indians also have second homes here. Lokhandwala has many shopping malls, large cinemas, clubs, parks, fitness centres, small to very large luxurious apartments and it is well connected to the rest of the city with excellent public transport facilities. It is 10 km from airport, 5 km from Andheri Station. Trains from Andheri Station to Churchgate  reach in 33 minutes. Lokhandwala complex is also equidistant to Versova Metro Station & DN Nagar Metro Station at 2.1 km each and also close to A102. Both metro stations making the reach to Ghaktkopar, accessible in about 22 mins.

Lokhandwala Complex shootout 

Lokhandwala Complex featured in the news headlines when on 16 November 1991, then Additional Commissioner of Police (ACP) Aftab Ahmed Khan, head of the ATS led a force of 100 police and ATS officers and engaged in a firefight with seven gangsters who were present in the Swati building within the complex. In the ensuing shootout which lasted four hours, 450 rounds were exchanged and all seven gangsters were killed, including Maya Dolas, Dilip Buwa and Anil Pawar.

In popular culture

This event was the basis for the 2007 Hindi film Shootout at Lokhandwala . The movies was starring Sanjay Dutt as ACP Aftab Ahmed Khan, Vivek Oberoi as Maya Dolas, Tushar Kapoor as Dilip Buwa and Amrita Singh as Maya's mother Ratnaprabha Dolas. The movie also featured the real-life former ACP Aftab Ahmed Khan in a cameo role as his superior, the police commissioner S. Ramamurthy.

Notable residents
 Anurag Singh
 Boney Kapoor
 Asin
Himesh Reshammiya
 Bhushan Kumar 
 Javed Jaffrey 
 Farah Khan 
 Shekhar Suman

References

External links
 Lokhandwala Complex wikimapia
 Lokhandwala Constructions

Neighbourhoods in Mumbai
Andheri